Chris Morgan may refer to:

Chris Morgan (ecologist) British-born ecologist, conservationist, and TV host
Chris Morgan (footballer) (born 1977), English football player
Chris Morgan (journalist) (1952–2008), journalist working for The Sunday Times (UK)
Chris Morgan (politician), British politician
Chris Morgan (powerlifter) (born 1973), powerlifting champion
Chris Morgan (writer), film screenwriter and comic writer
Chris Morgan, former guitarist for the blues rock band, Canned Heat
Chris Morgan (rower) (born 1982), Australian Olympic rower in the Beijing 2008 Olympics
Christopher Morgan (politician) (1808–1877), U.S. representative
Christopher Morgan (bishop) (born 1947), current bishop of Colchester
Christopher Morgan (Royal Navy officer) (born 1939)
Chris Morgan, alias of wrestler Chris Kanyon